Kaufering was the common name of a system of eleven subcamps of the Dachau concentration camp which operated between 18 June 1944 and 27 April 1945 and which were located around the towns of Landsberg am Lech and Kaufering in Bavaria.

Previously, Nazi Germany had deported all Jews from the Reich, but having exhausted other sources of labor, Jews were deported to Kaufering to create three massive underground bunkers, Weingut II, Diana II, and Walnuss II, which would not be vulnerable to the Allied bombing which had devastated German aircraft factories. The bunkers were intended for the production of Messerschmitt Me 262 aircraft, but none were produced at the camps before the United States Army captured the area.

Kaufering was the largest of the Dachau subcamps and also the one with the worst conditions; about half of the 30,000 prisoners died from hunger, disease, executions, or during the death marches. Most of the sites were not preserved and have been repurposed for other uses.

Establishment

In early 1944, Allied bombing raids had reduced the fighter aircraft production of German factories by as much as two-thirds. In order to reduce the effectiveness of Allied bombing, the Jägerstab, a task force of the Reich Ministry of Armaments and War Production for increasing fighter production, planned to move production underground. Existing underground areas, such as caves and mines, were not suited to factory production, so new concrete bunkers were to be built, using concentration camp prisoners for labor. Out of six planned bunkers, three began construction at Kaufering and another at nearby Mühldorf concentration camp.

Previously, Nazi Germany had attempted to make the Reich Judenrein ("cleansed of Jews") by deporting all Jews to eastern areas. However, they had exhausted other sources of forced labor, so Jews were deported to the Reich to work on the new project. Kaufering I, later redesignated Kaufering III, was established by a transport of 1,000 Hungarian Jewish men from Auschwitz concentration camp that arrived in Kaufering, Bavaria, on 18 June 1944. Prisoner functionaries were brought from Dachau to manage the new camp.

Forced labor

Unusually, the construction of the camps, as well as providing food and medical care, was the responsibility of the Organization Todt (OT), not the SS, which sought to extract the maximum labor for the minimum expense. The prisoners deported to each camp had to construct the accommodation themselves, The resulting huts, partially buried for camouflage from aerial reconnaissance, were completely inadequate for the weather conditions. Rain and snow leaked through the earthen roofs, and vermin infested the huts. Prisoners had to sleep in straw spread on the floor. Of Dachau's subcamps, Kaufering had the worst conditions.

Most prisoners were forced to work building railway embankments and hauling bags of cement for the bunker-building projects, codenamed Weingut II, Diana II and Walnuss II. The total floor area would be ; the Augsburg factory that it intended to replace had only  of floor area in three dispersal locations. For protection from air raids, 40% of the bunker was underground and its roof was covered with dirt for camouflage. At least 10,000 Jewish prisoners worked on the bunker at some point.

The bunkers were to be used for producing different components of the Messerschmitt Me 262A aircraft, the first operational jet aircraft, which the Germans hoped would turn the tide of war against the Allies. Messerschmitt AG hoped to produce 900 Me 262 aircraft and additional Me 163B rocket-powered aircraft at Kaufering, by employing 10,000 workers per shift in each bunker, 90,000 in all, of whom one-third were to be concentration camp prisoners. However, the construction of Diana II and Walnuss II was not finished due to the lack of concrete and steel. When the United States liberated the area in April 1945, the excavation of Weingut II was not complete, but already production machines had been set up.  However, not a single aircraft was produced before liberation.

The murderous conditions meant that most prisoners were incapacitated in a short time, and OT and construction workers brutally beat victims in order to extract labor. Most prisoners were forced to work building railway embankments and hauling bags of cement for the bunker-building projects. OT workers complained that, due to severe vermin infestation, prisoners spent time attempting to rid themselves of fleas when they were supposed to be working. In December 1944, an OT staff member observed that of 17,600 prisoners, only 8,319 were capable of work, including those only capable of light work. Because the companies that hired the workers complained that they had to pay for the labor of prisoners unable to work, transports totaling 1,322 or 1,451 people were dispatched to Auschwitz in September and October 1944, where the victims were gassed.

Command and organization
The SS hierarchy at Kaufering had mostly served at eastern death camps, such as Majdanek and Auschwitz, which had been liberated by the Red Army. The first commandant, Heinrich Forster, had previously worked at Sachsenhausen, Dachau, and Kovno concentration camps. Forster was replaced in December 1944 by Hans Aumeier, former deputy commandant of Auschwitz and commandant of Vaivara concentration camp. In February 1945, Otto Förschner, former commandant of Mittelbau-Dora, took over command of Kaufering. Architect Hermann Giesler, a close associate of Adolf Hitler, was in charge of the bunker construction.

Consisting of eleven subcamps, Kaufering was the largest of the Dachau subcamp systems, and probably the largest Jewish subcamp system in the Reich.

List of Kaufering subcamps

Prisoners

About 30,000 prisoners passed through the Kaufering camps, including 4,200 women and 850 children. This dwarfed the population of the surrounding area; only 10,000 people lived in the Landsberg area. Almost all of the prisoners were Jews. The majority of the prisoners came from Hungary or the areas annexed by Hungary. Eight thousand Jews were forced to leave the Kovno Ghetto in July 1944, as the Red Army approached; male prisoners were separated from the women and sent to Kaufering. Additional Jews arrived at Kaufering that summer during the liquidation of labor camps in the Baltics about to be overrun by the Red Army. These Jews had already survived countless "Aktions" in which victims were taken away to be murdered, and three years of forced labor, as well as long transports in cattle cars. Other Kaufering prisoners had survived four years in the Łódź Ghetto and a selection at Auschwitz. On 10 October 1944, a transport of Jewish men who had been imprisoned at the Theresienstadt Ghetto in the Protectorate of Bohemia and Moravia arrived via Auschwitz. Other Jewish prisoners were from the Netherlands, France, Italy, or Rhodes.

Some of the food allotted to prisoners was diverted by SS guards, further reducing the nutrient intake of prisoners. Those who were sick, with diseases such as typhus, spotted fever, and tuberculosis that were widespread in the camp, were fed even less, and rations were further reduced as the war drew to an end and shortages arose. Conditions were too harsh for a resistance movement to develop. However, survivors of the Kovno Ghetto continued to publish a clandestine newspaper, Nitsots (Spark), handwritten and illegally distributed. Elkhanan Elkes, head of the Judenrat at Kovno, was the camp elder of Kaufering I, where he died.

A commission established after the war estimated that 14,500 Kaufering prisoners had died. German historian Edith Raim wrote that about half of the 30,000 prisoners died before liberation. The main causes of death were hunger, disease, execution, deportation to Auschwitz, and the death marches. According to American historian Daniel Blatman, about 4,300 of those victims died at Kaufering itself; additional victims were sent to Dachau after becoming unable to work, or were killed during the death marches.

Death marches

As Allied troops approached, rumors circulated among the prisoners that the Germans were going to massacre them before liberation. In mid-April, SS general Ernst Kaltenbrunner relayed orders from Adolf Hitler for the Luftwaffe to bomb Dachau, Landsberg, and Mühldorf, which all had high Jewish populations. The Gauleiter of Munich, Paul Giesler, ordered Bertus Gerdes, administrator of Upper Bavaria, to prepare plans for the extermination of the surviving prisoners. Gerdes prevaricated, citing the lack of airplane fuel and ammunition as well as poor weather. In response, Kaltenbrunner ordered that the Kaufering prisoners be taken to Dachau main camp, where they were to be poisoned. Gerdes ordered a local doctor to prepare poison, but this plan could not be implemented either. The third plan was to take the prisoners to Ötz Valley in the Alps, where they were to be murdered "in one way or another".

According to German records, 10,114 prisoners, including 1,093 women, were at Kaufering camps during the last week of April. Most of them were evacuated to Dachau or locations further south, either on foot or by train. Prisoners faced a difficult choice of whether to join the death marches or to try to stay behind, knowing that they might be massacred. On the death marches, anyone who could not keep up was beaten or shot, leading to many deaths. The evacuation was disorderly, and many prisoners succeeded in escaping during the roundups at the camp or later, when the columns were attacked by American aircraft. On 23 April, 1,200 prisoners left Kaufering VI (Türkheim) on foot and joined the prisoners forced on a death march from Dachau's main camp. Another 1,500 prisoners left Kaufering the next day, proceeding at first on foot and later by train. On multiple occasions, the prisoners were attacked by Allied aircraft. In one of these attacks, which hit a train carrying ammunition as well as prisoners, hundreds of victims were killed. Some of the prisoners evacuated from Kaufering ended up at Allach concentration camp.

Hundreds of the evacuees from Kaufering arrived at Buchberg labor camp (south of Wolfratshausen) on 29 April. Otto Moll, a functionary of Kaufering, attempted to massacre these prisoners but was foiled by the camp commander. Instead Moll killed 120 or 150 Russian prisoners from Buchberg. Many of those who left Kaufering were liberated at Dachau on 28 April, but others were forced to march southwards into Upper Bavaria and were not freed until May. Kaufering IV, where those incapable of walking were held, was set on fire on the orders of the SS doctor, Max Blancke. Hundreds of sick and emaciated prisoners were trapped inside and killed. Shortly afterwards, Blancke committed suicide.

Liberation and aftermath

The subcamps of Kaufering were liberated between 24 and 27 April 1945 by the Seventh United States Army.

The 12th Armored Division reached Kaufering IV on 27 April, with the 101st Airborne Division arriving the next day. The 522nd Field Artillery Battalion, which consisted entirely of Japanese Americans, also participated in the liberation, as did the 36th Infantry Division from 30 April. The liberators found 500 charred corpses, many of them naked, which they forced local German residents to bury. The remaining structures were "indescribably filthy" because dying prisoners had been left there. American soldiers documented the camps in photographs and newsreels. One of the liberators reported:

Nine of the forty defendants of the Dachau Trial were charged with crimes committed at Kaufering. In addition, three individuals stood trial individually in German courts for their actions at Kaufering, two of them former prisoner-functionaries at the camp. Aumeier was extradited to Poland, where he was convicted and executed. A large displaced persons camp was located in Landsberg in the postwar era, led by Lithuanian Jews who had survived Kaufering.

Commemoration

There are dozens of "" (mass graves) with the remains of thousands of people who died at Kaufering. The largest of these are at Kaufering II and III, with about 2,000 and 1,500 victims respectively. Many of the grave markers are overgrown and difficult to find. By the railroad tracks outside the village of Schwabhausen, there are three mass graves next to the railway line, victims of Allied strafing, which are marked by plaques. At Sankt Ottilien there is a small cemetery with the remains of about 40 prisoners who died shortly after liberation.

At the beginning of the 1980s, a private association called  (Landsberg in the 20th Century) was formed to commemorate Kaufering. The site of Kaufering VII was purchased after a Jewish survivor donated the money on the condition that a memorial be erected, which has not been accomplished. In 2014, the federal government gave 700,000 euros to the European Holocaust Memorial in Landsberg (Landsberg Holocaust Memorial Association) and the city of Landsberg donated land with architectural remains. Restoration work was done between 2009 and 2016 on three intact and three ruined earthen huts and the housing of the SS guards, by the Europäische Holocaustgedenkstätte, winning the Bavarian Historic Conservation Prize in Gold. The site is fenced off and not accessible to visitors, but there are informational and commemorative plaques nearby. According to historian Edith Raim, the Landsberg im 20. Jahrhundert association and its director, Anton Posset, have refused access to the site to survivors and their families, the Israeli ambassador Shimon Stein, and inspectors of the Bavarian List of Monuments.

Besides Kaufering VII, there are hardly any remnants of the Kaufering subcamps, whose locations were only definitively established due to Raim's work. Most of the sites are now used for gardens, forests, agriculture, or housing. Landsberg am Lech has a prominent plaque in the center of town commemorating the German soldiers who died in both World Wars, but no memorial to the Holocaust victims. There is a modest memorial at Kaufering III, while a student project to establish an information board was not maintained and fell into disrepair. Only grave markers remain at Kaufering II and VI. A tennis court operates on the former site of Kaufering I, while Kaufering VI has been built over and there is a McDonald's nearby. Traces of the fire set by the SS at Kaufering IV were destroyed by gravel-mining in the 1980s; a hunting tower resembling the guard towers at concentration camps was erected by a local resident, which one visitor found "rather disturbing".

Only one of the bunkers built by slave laborers, Weingut II, survives. During the 1960s, it was repurposed for use by the Bundeswehr, as part of the  facility, and is still in use as a repair facility by the German Air Force, .

List of cemeteries of Kaufering subcamps 

see German article with pictures

 Concentration camp cemetery for the Kaufering I – Landsberg remote camp (Landsberg industrial estate) 
 Concentration camp cemetery for the Kaufering II – Igling remote camp (near the Aussiedlerhof, built by the concentration camp command of Otto Moll, the gas chamber commander of Auschwitz) 
 Concentration camp cemetery for the Kaufering II – Igling and XI – Stadtwaldhof/Landsberg remote camps (Landsberg/Holzhausen intersection) 
 Concentration camp cemetery for the Kaufering III – Kaufering remote camp (barrage weir) 
 Concentration camp cemetery for the Kaufering IV – Hurlach external camp (barrage weir), for those who were found later 
 Kaufering IV – Hurlach Cemetery of the Holocaust, April 27, 1945, directly in the former concentration camp area, built by the American liberators 
 Concentration camp cemetery for those deceased after liberation in Holzhausen/Buchloe 
 Concentration camp cemetery for theKaufering VI – Türkheim remote camp in Türkheim-Bahnhof 
 Concentration camp cemetery for the Kaufering VII – Erpfting remote camp (near the Maria oak chapel, at the junction Landsberg - Erpfting district) 
 Concentration camp cemetery for the Kaufering VIII – Seestall remote camp (at the barrage weir at Lech in Seestall) 
 Concentration camp cemetery for the Kaufering IX – Obermeitingen concentration camp remote camp – unknown.
 Concentration camp cemetery for the Kaufering V and X – Utting remote camp (on the connecting road from Utting to Holzhausen) 
 Concentration camp cemetery in Sankt Ottilien for survivors of the transport train to Dachau of 27 April 1945 next to the Christian cemetery of the monks of the monastery Sankt Ottilien 
 Three concentration camp memorial stones with Hebrew inscription indicate: "Dead Jewish victims of an air raid on the transport train with Jewish concentration camp prisoners of the Kaufering concentration camp command of 27 April 1945".

In popular culture
The liberation of Kaufering IV was depicted in the second half of Episode 9 "Why We Fight" of the TV mini-series Band of Brothers, a dramatization of E Company, 506th Infantry Regiment, 101st Airborne Division. Although it was filmed in Hertfordshire, England, the episode is a realistic recreation of actual events depicted in historic photos and newsreels. For example, the soldiers have to confine the prisoners to the camp because there is not enough medical care available, and German civilians are forced to bury the dead. The American soldiers, who had previously fought from a parachute landing on D-Day through France and Germany, have become disillusioned, but confronting the horrors of the Nazi regime reminds them why they are fighting the war. Commentators rate the episode as one of the best of the series. American writer J. D. Salinger, the author of Catcher in the Rye, was one of the liberators of Kaufering IV.

Austrian psychologist Viktor Frankl was deported from Theresienstadt to Kaufering via Auschwitz in October 1944; he spent five months in Kaufering III and was transferred to Kaufering VI in March 1945. His 1946 memoir, Man's Search for Meaning, has sold more than ten million copies and been translated into 24 languages. Large parts of the book are purportedly set in Auschwitz, where Frankl spent only three days, but actually depict his experience at Kaufering. In the book, Frankl develops his theory of logotherapy and argues that prisoners who maintained a positive attitude were more likely to survive. His work has however not been positively received by Holocaust historians, who maintain that Frankl's theories do not explain why some prisoners survived and others did not.

References
Citations

Bibliography

Further reading

External links
—a website about the camp

Messerschmitt
Dachau concentration camp
War crimes of the Wehrmacht
Subcamps of Dachau